Sergio "Sy" Mora Zuniga was a Costa Rican-American soccer forward who earned a cap in a 2-1 loss to Mexico on September 10, 1972.

In 1995, Mora, who coached several youth teams in central Florida, coached the Orlando Lions of the USISL.  He also worked for Martin Marietta

References

1942 births
2009 deaths
People from Lake Mary, Florida
American soccer players
United States men's international soccer players
Costa Rican footballers
Costa Rican emigrants to the United States
USISL coaches
Association football forwards